Palekh miniature is a Russian folk handicraft of a miniature painting, which is done with tempera paints on varnished articles made of papier-mâché (including the creation of small boxes, cigarette cases, and powder cases).

History 
Palekh Russian lacquer art on papier-mâché first appeared in 1923 in the village of Palekh, located in the Palekhsky District (Ivanovo Oblast), and is based on a long local history of icon painting. This handicraft and style of miniature painting bore different names throughout its development, such as the Palekh Artel of Ancient Painting (since 1924), Palekh Artists’ Association (since 1932), and Artistic Production Workshops of the Artistic Fund of the USSR (since 1953).

The technology of making a semi-finished product was borrowed from the lacquer handicraft masters of Fedoskino (see Fedoskino miniature). The Palekh miniatures usually represent characters from real life, literary works, fairy tales, bylinas, and songs. They are painted with local bright paints over the black background and are known for their delicate and smooth design, abundance of golden shading, and accurate silhouettes of flattened figures, which often cover the surface of the lids and sides of the articles completely. Poetic magic of the Palekh characters, decorativeness of landscapes and architecture, and elongated proportions of the figures go back to the icon-painting traditions. The miniatures are usually set off with a complicated pattern made with gold dissolved in aqua regia. Palekh is the most renowned of four such famous villages, the others being Kholuy, Mstyora, and Fedoskino, each producing similar, but clearly distinct artistic style.

The art of miniature painting is still alive today. Nowadays there are workshops of the Artistic Fund of Russia, as well as small private studios and independent artists in Palekh. Palekh miniature artists are trained at the Palekh Art College founded in 1935.

Works by Palekh masters are kept in numerous museums of Russia and abroad. The State Palekh Art Museum in Palekh boasts the biggest miniature painting collection, comprising over two thousand works.

Palekh on the Soviet postage stamps

References

External links
 
 Palekh Miniature

Russian handicrafts
Miniature painting
Russian inventions
Papier-mâché
1923 introductions